Top Sergeant: The Life and Times of Sergeant Major of the Army William G. Bainbridge is the autobiography of American soldier William G. Bainbridge, the fifth man to serve as Sergeant Major of the Army.  This memoir was co-authored by Dan Cragg, also a retired Sergeant Major.  It was published in 1995 by Fawcett.

1995 non-fiction books
American autobiographies
Military autobiographies
Ballantine Books books
Collaborative autobiographies
Non-fiction books about the United States Army